Faisal Aziz (born 1957) is an Iraqi former footballer who played as a forward. He represented the Iraq national team in the 1982 Asian Games.

Faisal played for the national team between 1980 and 1981. He made his international debut against Poland in 1980. In 1981, he helped Iraq win the Pestabola Merdeka.

References

Living people
1957 births
Iraqi footballers
Iraq international footballers
Association football midfielders
Al-Shorta SC players
Iraqi football managers
Al-Shorta SC managers
Footballers at the 1982 Asian Games
Asian Games medalists in football
Asian Games gold medalists for Iraq
Medalists at the 1982 Asian Games